= Tharushah Junction railway station =

Railway station in Sindh, Pakistan

Tharushah Junction Railway Station ٺارو شاھ جنڪشن ريلوي اسٽيشن

General information
- Owner: Ministry of Railways

Other information
- Station code: TRSH

History
- Former names: Great Indian Peninsula Railway

Tharushah (Urdu: 'تھاروشا, Sindhi: ٺارو شاھ جنڪشن ريلوي اسٽيشن) is located in Tharu Shah Town, Sindh, Pakistan.

== See also ==
- List of railway stations in Pakistan
- Pakistan Railways
